Athan Iannucci (born April 15, 1982) is a professional lacrosse player. He played collegiate lacrosse at Hofstra University. Iannucci played professional lacrosse for the Colorado Mammoth of the National Lacrosse League. He was a member of the now defunct St. Regis Indians of the Ontario Lacrosse Association's Senior-A  Major Series Lacrosse. He plays in the summer months for the WLA Langley Thunder.

Professional career

NLL career
Iannucci was a First Round Draft pick (8th Overall) by the Philadelphia Wings of the National Lacrosse League in the 2007 NLL Entry Draft.  He was awarded Rookie of the Week Honors in Week 5 and Week 15 of the 2007 season, and was also named to the 2007 All-Rookie team.  As a rookie, he led the Wings in goals scored.

Iannucci's second season in the league was record-setting. On April 12, 2008, Iannucci scored three goals and broke Gary Gait's National Lacrosse League record of 61 goals in a season.

During 2008, Iannucci was awarded Player of the Month honours in both January and February, the first time since 1996 that a player has been Player of the Month in back-to-back months. He was also named player of the month for April, giving him three of the four player of the month awards in the 2008 season. He led the league in goals, points, and shots on goal, was named Offensive and Overall Player of the Week in week 16, was named to both the starting All-Star team and the First All-Pro team. His stellar season was capped off when he was named 2008 NLL Most Valuable Player, the first Wings player to do so since Gary Gait in 1997.

In June 2008, Iannucci suffered two meniscal tears in his knee, and underwent successful knee surgery in July. He did not play again until Philadelphia's third game of the 2009 season, but left that game after only playing a few minutes. Iannucci sat out the 2010 NLL season to undergo further surgery, a right leg ligament reconstruction.

After scoring 100 (71g 29a) points with the Wings in 2011, Philadelphia traded Iannucci to the Edmonton Rush with teammates Alex Turner and Brodie McDonald, along with Philadelphia's first round draft picks in 2012, 2013 and 2014. In exchange, the Wings acquired Edmonton transition player Brodie Merrill, Rush forwards Dean Hill, Mike McLellan, and Edmonton's 41st selection in the 2011 entry draft, and the 4th round selection in 2013.

Iannucci never signed a contract with the Rush, and on February 13, 2012, he was traded to the Washington Stealth for Paul Rabil.

After two seasons in Washington, Iannucci was released by the Stealth prior to the 2014 season but only two weeks into the season, he was signed by the Colorado Mammoth.

MLL
The Chicago Machine selected Iannucci first Overall in the 2007 Major League Lacrosse Supplemental Draft,  though he played sparingly with the team in 2007.

He signed with the Toronto Nationals expansion team in 2009, but played just two games with the team before being released.

WLA/OLA career
In 2007, Iannucci won the Denny Huddleston Memorial Trophy in the Western Lacrosse Association as the league's top scorer with the New Westminster Salmonbellies.   In 1999, he won the Joe Nieuwendyk Award as the top rookie in the OLA Junior A Lacrosse League. In 2008, he played for St. Regis Indians of the Ontario Lacrosse Association's Senior-A  Major Series Lacrosse until he injured his knee.  The knee was successfully repaired by surgery and Iannucci is expected to rehabilitate for approximately 6 months, in time for the next NLL season. While playing for the Langley Thunder on August 27, 2011, the team won the Western Lacrosse Association Championship for the first time in franchise history. Iannucci is expected to play in the national Mann Cup that will be held in September 2011 at the Langley Events Centre.

College career
Iannucci attended Hofstra University.  In 2006, he tied with teammate Chris Unterstein for leading scorer the nation with 80 points (62G, 18A) in 19 games. While at Hofstra, Iannucci had back surgery to repair a disc herniation.

Iannucci played only three years at Hofstra, after his NCAA eligibility waiver for a fourth year was denied due to his prior playing career in the Canadian summer box lacrosse leagues.

Personal life
Iannucci lives in Langley, British Columbia, with his wife Jamie and four children, Ryker, Nixon, Hawksen, and Presley.

Statistics

NLL
Reference:

MLL

Junior "A"

Senior "A"

Hofstra University

Awards

References

1982 births
Canadian lacrosse players
Colorado Mammoth players
Hofstra Pride men's lacrosse players
Living people
Major League Lacrosse players
National Lacrosse League All-Stars
National Lacrosse League major award winners
Philadelphia Wings players
Sportspeople from New Westminster
Hamilton Nationals players
Washington Stealth players